Basville is a commune in the Creuse department in the Nouvelle-Aquitaine region in central France.

Geography

The small river Tardes rises in the commune, then flows west through the commune.

The Chavanon (locally called la Ramade) forms part of the commune's southern border.

Population

Sights
 The church of Notre-Dame, dating from the twelfth century.
 Several old watermills.
 A dolmen at the Bois d'Urbe.
 A Roman pottery kiln at la Villatte.
 The Château du Layris.
 The thirteenth century church at Saint-Alvard.

See also
Communes of the Creuse department

References

Communes of Creuse